Zapp is the debut studio album by the American funk band Zapp, released on July 30, 1980 by Warner Bros. Records. The album's style and sound bears a striking resemblance to Parliament-Funkadelic, as the band was working with and being mentored by P-Funk members William Earl "Bootsy" Collins and George Clinton during the album's production. The album was produced by Zapp frontman Roger Troutman along with funk musician Bootsy Collins. The Troutman family of the Zapp band had close ties with the Collins family, both being Ohio natives. This friendship proved instrumental in Zapp gaining a record deal with Warner Bros. Records in 1979. Zapp was recorded between late 1979 and early 1980 at the United Sound Studios in Detroit, Michigan, of which Parliament-Funkadelic frequented.

The album reached #1 on the US Billboard Hot R&B tracks chart for 2 weeks in fall 1980. The album has been cited as one of the definitive albums of early 1980s electro funk, bringing the genre to mainstream attention. The album has also served as a partial source toward the creation of the G-funk sound of hip hop music, which became popular on the West Coast of the United States during the early and mid 1990s. Zapp was certified gold by the Recording Industry Association of America (RIAA) in November 1980.

Background and recording
During the late 1970s, Zapp was noticed by two longstanding friends of the Troutman family, Phelps "Catfish" Collins and William Earl "Bootsy" Collins, both of whom were members of Parliament-Funkadelic since the early 1970s. Earlier, Roger Troutman and his brothers played frequently in the Ohio area, originally forming the band "Roger and His Fabulous Vels" in 1966.

Impressed with Zapp's musical abilities upon seeing their live performance, Catfish and Bootsy invited Zapp to visit Detroit's United Sound Studios, where they went on to write and record the demo for "More Bounce to the Ounce," which would later appear on the debut album. Parliament-Funkadelic front-man George Clinton encouraged the band to present the demo tape to Warner Bros. Records, which ultimately led to the band's signing to the label in early 1979.

The full album was ultimately recorded in the same studio between late 1979 and early 1980 and was released on July 28, 1980 under the Warner Bros. label. Zapp was produced by both Roger Troutman and Bootsy Collins, who also provided the guitar work for the album.

In popular culture
"More Bounce to the Ounce" is featured in the films Boyz n the Hood, Mi Vida Loca, Losing Isaiah, Hate, Any Given Sunday , Blue Hill Avenue and Straight Outta Compton the 2002 Rockstar video game Grand Theft Auto: Vice City and the 2018 South Park episode "A Boy and a Priest". It was also in an episode of "New Girl" (Season 4, episode 20).

Track listing
All songs written by Roger Troutman

Side one:

"More Bounce to the Ounce" – 9:25
"Freedom" – 3:48
"Brand New Player" – 5:51

Side two:

"Funky Bounce" – 6:46
"Be Alright" – 7:52
"Coming Home" – 6:34

Chart performance
In 1980, "More Bounce To the Ounce" went to number 2 on the US Black singles chart and the self-titled album went straight to number one on the US Black albums chart also in 1980.

Certifications

Personnel
vocals - Bobby Glover, Jannetta Boyce, Marchelle  Smith, Delores Smith
percussion - Larry and Lester Troutman
conga drums - Larry Troutman
trapp drums - Lester Troutman
bass, vocals - Terry Troutman
sax - Carl Cowen
keyboards, vocals - Greg Jackson
guitars - Bootsy Collins
guitars, vocals, keyboards, talk box, bass, harmonica, vibraphone - Roger Troutman

Album Cover Art by
Ronald P'"Stozo" Edwards and Overton Loyd

See also
List of number-one R&B albums of 1980 (U.S.)

References

Further reading
Tony Bolden, The funk era and beyond: new perspectives on black popular culture. Macmillan, 2008.
Portia K. Maultsby, "Dayton Street Funk: The Layering of Multiple Identities" The Ashgate research companion to popular musicology. Ashgate, 2009.
Dave Tompkins, Wax Poetics Magazine number 35 (2009)
Rickey Vincent, Funk: the music, the people, and the rhythm of the one. Macmillan, 1996.
Alexander G. Weheliye. “Feenin: Posthuman Voices in Black Popular Music.” Social Text 71 (summer 2002): 21-47.

1980 debut albums
Albums produced by Bootsy Collins
Albums produced by Roger Troutman
Warner Records albums
Zapp (band) albums